Saginaw Charter Township is a charter township of Saginaw County in the U.S. state of Michigan. The population was 41,679 at the 2020 census. The city of Saginaw is adjacent to the township to the southeast, but is administratively autonomous.

The township is also a component of the Saginaw Metropolitan Statistical Area and the greater Saginaw-Midland-Bay City Combined Statistical Area in the Mid/Central Michigan region.

Geography

Demographics
As of the census of 2000, there were 39,657 people, 17,096 households, and 10,685 families residing in the township. The racial makeup of the township was 88.77% White, 5.28% African American, 0.27% Native American, 2.68% Asian, 0.01% Pacific Islander, 1.47% from other races, and 1.52% from two or more races. Hispanic or Latino of any race were 4.17% of the population.

There were 17,096 households, out of which 25.8% had children under the age of 18 living with them, 51.3% were married couples living together, 8.8% had a female householder with no husband present, and 37.5% were non-families. 31.9% of all households were made up of individuals, and 15.0% had someone living alone who was 65 years of age or older.  The average household size was 2.27 and the average family size was 2.88.

In the township, 21.1% of the population was under the age of 18, 9.2% was from 18 to 24, 24.7% from 25 to 44, 25.7% from 45 to 64, and 19.2% was 65 years of age or older.  The median age was 42 years. For every 100 females, there were 88.2 males.  For every 100 females age 18 and over, there were 83.4 males.

The median income for a household in the township was $45,147, and the median income for a family was $60,625. Males had a median income of $49,084 versus $30,620 for females. The per capita income for the township was $25,759.  6.6% of the population and 4.4% of families were below the poverty line.   7.0% of those are under the age of 18 and 8.0% of those 65 and older were living below the poverty line.

History
Saginaw Township predates its parent county. When Saginaw Township was organized as part of Oakland County in 1831, in accordance with an 1830 act of Michigan's Territorial Legislature, it covered all of today's Saginaw County (organized in 1835) and part of Bay, Genesee and Midland counties. As the boundaries for these counties were set, and new townships within Saginaw County organized, Saginaw Township was reduced to its present boundaries. The territory of the present City of Saginaw west of the Saginaw River was taken from Saginaw Township when the city of Saginaw was incorporated in 1857.

In May 2020, Saginaw County residents (including parts of Saginaw Township, Thomas Township, and Tittabawassee Township), along with various Midland County residents (including parts of the city of Midland, the village of Sanford, Edenville Township, Midland Township, Lincoln Township, Homer Township and Dow Chemical) were forced to evacuate due to high flooding caused by the breach of the Edenville and Sanford dams.

Education

Public school districts
Saginaw Township Community Schools

Public high schools
Heritage High School

Private high schools
Nouvel Catholic Central High School
Valley Lutheran High School

References

External links
Saginaw Charter Township
Saginaw Township Community Schools

Townships in Saginaw County, Michigan
Charter townships in Michigan
1831 establishments in Michigan Territory